The Yelwa massacre was a series of related incidents of religious violence between Muslims and Christians which took place in Yelwa, Nigeria between February and May 2004. These incidents killed over 700 people. The first occurred on 4 February 2004 when armed Muslims attacked the Christians of Yelwa, killing more than 78 Christians, including at least 48 who were worshipping inside a church compound. According to some sources, the signal for the attack was a call for Jihad from the local mosque.

The February killings inflamed tensions between the communities which had been growing since the 2001 Jos riots when conflict between Muslims and Christians resulted in 1,000 dead. On 2 May 2004 local Christians responded to the February incident by attacking Muslims in Yelwa, resulting in roughly 630 dead. According to some sources, Muslim girls were forced to eat pork and other foods forbidden to Muslims and some were even raped.

Background 
Thousands of people have died in fighting since the passage of Sharia law in the Muslim-dominated northern region after a return to civilian rule in 1999. The origin of the conflict between the Christian Tarok and the Muslim Fulani is rooted in their competing claims over the fertile farmlands of Plateau State in central Nigeria.

See also 
List of massacres in Nigeria

References

External links 
  Eyewitness: Nigeria's 'town of death'
 Nigeria: Prevent Further Bloodshed in Plateau State – Human Rights Watch

2004 murders in Nigeria
Boko Haram activities
Mass murder in 2004
Yelwa
Attacks on religious buildings and structures in Nigeria